Route 230 is a two-lane east/west provincial highway on the south shore of the Saint Lawrence River in the Bas-Saint-Laurent region of Eastern Quebec, Canada. Its eastern terminus is in Saint-Alexandre-de-Kamouraska east of the junction of Route 289 and the western terminus is at the junction of Route 132 in La Pocatière.

Municipalities along Route 230

 La Pocatière
 Saint-Pacôme
 Saint-Philippe-de-Néri
 Saint-Pascal
 Sainte-Hélène-de-Kamouraska
 Saint-Alexandre-de-Kamouraska

See also
 List of Quebec provincial highways

References

External links 
 Provincial Route Map (Courtesy of the Quebec Ministry of Transportation) 
 Route 230 on Google Maps.

230